Offenbach am Main Hauptbahnhof is a railway station serving the German city of Offenbach am Main. It is located on the Frankfurt–Bebra railway/South Main line between Frankfurt and Hanau on the south bank of the Main. It is also the starting point of the Rodgau Railway, via Obertshausen, Rodgau and Ober-Roden to Dieburg (originally to Reinheim).

History

The station was built from 1872 to 1873 during the construction of the Frankfurt–Bebra railway and was given an entrance building in Renaissance Revival style. It was commissioned by the Königliche Eisenbahndirektion (Royal Railway Division) of Frankfurt. Because of the development of the city around the line which was originally laid on the same level as the roads, the railway was put on an embankment between 1912 and 1926 so that the increasing road traffic could run under it. This forced the rail track field to be elevated. A new station building was out of the question because of the depressed economic conditions. The entrance building was radically restructured in the 1920s with a "conservative-traditionalist”  appearance. The entrance building is listed as a monument under the Hessian Monument Protection Act. There is a fountain by Bruno Schaefer called Vogelbrunnen ("bird fountain") on the platform between tracks 1 and 2.

Significance

The station was temporarily connected to Deutsche Bahn’s Intercity-Express network in May 1996, but it now has few long-distance services. It has up to two Intercity services each day. Otherwise there are only regional services to destinations in Hesse and Bavaria.

Even before that Offenbach Hauptbahnhof had been greatly reduced in its importance, because a line of the Rhine-Main S-Bahn had been built through Offenbach. This runs in a tunnel under central Offenbach and bypasses the Hauptbahnhof. On its western side it partly uses the route of the former Frankfurt-Offenbach Local Railway (Frankfurt-Offenbach Lokalbahn).

After Deutsche Bahn had stopped investing in the station building for some time, the ticket office was closed in January 2011, so that Offenbach Hauptbahnhof no longer has any rail staff.

The city of Offenbach has proposed that Offenbach (Main) Ost station be declared the Hauptbahnhof because of its better transport connections. This would further reduce the significance of the current Hauptbahnhof.

Services
IC connections
Frankfurt (Main) Hbf – Offenbach (Main) Hbf – Hanau Hbf – Fulda – Bebra
 Dresden Hbf – Leipzig Hbf – Halle (Saale) Hbf – Weimar – Erfurt Hbf – Fulda – Hanau Hbf – Offenbach (Main) Hbf – Frankfurt (Main) Hbf*
(*) Only in the direction shown

Regional connections
 RE 50: Fulda – Wächtersbach – Gelnhausen – Hanau Hbf – Offenbach (Main) Hbf – Frankfurt (Main) Hbf
 RB 51: Wächtersbach – Gelnhausen – Langenselbold – Hanau Hbf – Offenbach (Main) Hbf – Frankfurt (Main) Hbf
 RE 55: (Bamberg Hbf – Würzburg Hbf – Aschaffenburg Hbf –) Hanau Hbf – Offenbach (Main) Hbf – Frankfurt (Main) Hbf
 RE 85: (Erbach (Odenw) –) Groß-Umstadt Wiebelsbach – Babenhausen (Hess) – Seligenstadt (Hess) – Hanau Hbf – Offenbach (Main) Hbf – Frankfurt (Main) Hbf

Notes

References

External links 

 

Hauptbahnhof
Buildings and structures in Offenbach am Main
Railway stations in Germany opened in 1873